Krukowski (feminine: Krukowska; plural: Krukowscy) is a Polish surname. It may refer to:

 Andrzej Krukowski (born 1961), Polish actor
 Kazimierz Krukowski (1901–1984), Polish cabaret performer
 Magdalena Krukowska (born 1987), Polish canoer
 Marcin Krukowski (born 1992), Polish javelin thrower
 Piotr Krukowski, Polish weightlifter

See also
 
 
 Krukowski coat of arms

Polish-language surnames